Odontanthera is a genus of plants in the family Apocynaceae first described as a genus in 1883. It contains only one recognized species, Odontanthera radians, a rare plant native to the shores of the Red Sea.

formerly included
moved to other genera (Conomitra, Glossonema)
 O. boveana now  Glossonema boveanum
 O. linearis now Conomitra linearis
 O. thruppii now  Glossonema thruppii
 O. varians now  Glossonema varians

References

Monotypic Apocynaceae genera
Asclepiadoideae